Tanin may refer to:

 Tanin gas field, a natural gas field off the coast of Israel
 Tanin Industrial Company, a defunct Thai home appliance company
 Tanin (newspaper), a Turkish newspaper
 INS Tanin (S71) (formerly HMS Springer), an S-class submarine formerly commissioned to the Israeli Navy
 INS Tanin, a Dolphin-class submarine commissioned in 2014 to the Israeli Navy

See also 
 Tannin